Shangezhuang Station is a station on Line 14 of the Beijing Subway.  It is located in Chaoyang District. It was opened on December 28, 2014, and serves as the northern terminus of the east section of the line.

Station layout 
The station has an underground island platform.

Exits 
There are 4 exits, lettered A, B, C, and D. Exit C is accessible.

References

Railway stations in China opened in 2014
Beijing Subway stations in Chaoyang District